The Chef's Classics Lady Red Spikers are a professional volleyball club sponsored by the 	LJS Group of Companies playing in the Premier Volleyball League (formerly, Shakey's V-League).

History 
The team debuted in the league's 2019 Premier Volleyball League Open Conference and finished at 9th place. It is composed of players mostly from the San Beda University women's volleyball team.

Current roster 
For the 2019 Premier Volleyball League Open Conference:

Coaching staff
 Head Coach: Nemesio Gavino Jr.

Team Staff
 Team Manager:
 Team Trainer:

Medical Staff
 Team Physician:
 Physical Therapist:

Honors

Team

Coaches 
  Nemesio Gavino Jr. (2019)

Team captain
  Princess Justine Tiu (2019)

References 

2019 establishments in the Philippines
Women's volleyball teams in the Philippines